Pasig's at-large congressional district is the sole congressional district of the Philippines in the city of Pasig. It has been represented in the House of Representatives of the Philippines since 1987. Pasig first elected a single representative city-wide at-large for the 8th Congress following the ratification of the 1987 Constitution that restored the House of Representatives. Before 1987, the city was represented as part of Pasig–Marikina and Rizal's 2nd and at-large district, and Manila's at-large district. It is currently represented in the 19th Congress by Roman Romulo, an Independent.

Representation history

Election results

2022

2019

2016

2013

2010

See also
Legislative districts of Pasig

References

Congressional districts of the Philippines
Politics of Pasig
1987 establishments in the Philippines
At-large congressional districts of the Philippines
Congressional districts of Metro Manila
Constituencies established in 1987